Currie Barracks is a residential neighbourhood in the southwest quadrant of Calgary, Alberta, Canada. It is located on former Canadian Forces Base (CFB) Calgary, bounded by the Lincoln Park community to the southwest, Sarcee Road SW to the west, 33 Avenue SW to the north, and Crowchild Trail to the east. Being part of former CFB Calgary, the neighbourhood is planned for redevelopment under the CFB West Master Plan  by Canada Lands Company.

Currie Barracks is located within Calgary City Council's Ward 8.

Demographics 

See also 
 List of neighbourhoods in Calgary

References 

Neighbourhoods in Calgary